Ippudo, also known as  in Japan, is a Japanese ramen restaurant chain with locations worldwide. Ippudo is well known for its tonkotsu ramen, and has been described as "the most famous tonkotsu ramen shop in the country".

History
Ippudo was started in Fukuoka by Shigemi Kawahara, the CEO of Chikaranomoto Company. "Ippudo" in direct translation means "one wind hall". This is because at the time, there were dark clouds over the Kyushu ramen industry, and the founder and CEO intended to "blow wind and revolutionise the era".

The first restaurant opened in 1985, in the Daimyo District of Chuo Ward, in Fukuoka City. Gradually the number of restaurants expanded from regional areas to the whole of Japan, mainly in the Kanto and Kansai regions. In 2000, as a tie-up with 7-Eleven, a cup noodle version was made by Nissin Foods.

In 2008, the first overseas restaurant opened in New York City's East Village, with another location in Midtown West opening in 2013. Ippudo NY has been praised many times in the press for its ramen bowls. Ippudo expanded into Singapore in 2009 with a restaurant in the Mandarin Gallery section of the 5-star Mandarin Orchard Singapore hotel, while a second restaurant, Ippudo Tao, was opened in 2010 at UE Square. In 2013, it was re-branded as Ippudo SG @ Mohamed Sultan. On 18 July 2011, Ippudo officially opened their Hong Kong branch in Silvercord, Tsim Sha Tsui.

In 2014, Ippudo opened its first European restaurant in Central Saint Giles in London. The same year, Ippudo first entered the Philippine market with its first branch at SM Megamall. It has since been succeeded by other branches across Metro Manila.

2022 animal cruelty campaign
Ippudo restaurants have been targeted by a campaign claiming they use animal cruelty in their supply chain in Hong Kong and Taiwan  This campaign claims Ippudo restaurants in Hong Kong and Taiwan use eggs from battery cages that are banned by the European Union Council Directive 1999/74/EC. Ippudo restaurants in Hong Kong and Taiwan are operated under Maxim’s Caterers who were the main targets of this campaign. The campaign has targeted other restaurants under Maxim’s Caterers such as Maxim’s MX, Genki Sushi, and Arome Bakery so far.

Locations

Asia
 China: Beijing, Guangzhou, Shanghai, Shenzhen
 Vietnam: Ho Chi Minh City
 Hong Kong
 Indonesia
 Japan
 Malaysia: Kuala Lumpur, Penang
 Myanmar: Yangon
 Philippines: Manila
 Singapore
 Taiwan: Kaohsiung, Tainan, Taipei
 Thailand: Bangkok

Australasia
 Australia: Sydney, Perth, Melbourne
 New Zealand: Auckland

Europe
 France: Paris
 United Kingdom: London

North America
 USA: Cupertino, Berkeley, San Francisco, New York City, West Hollywood

See also
 Ramen shop

References

External links

 Ippudo Japan

Restaurants established in 1985
Ramen shops
1985 establishments in Japan
Companies listed on the Tokyo Stock Exchange